Nigerian Universities Theatre Arts Students Association.

It is the name or part of the name of several communes in France:
 Nans, Doubs
 Les Nans, Jura
 Nans-les-Pins, Var
 Nans-sous-Sainte-Anne, Doubs

NUTAF- Nigerian Universities Theatre Arts Festival.

 
 
 euromodulation Society
National Association of Neighborhood Schools

See also 
 Nan (disambiguation)